Donald Alexander Robertson (October 15, 1930 – April 11, 2014) was a Major League Baseball player. He batted and threw left-handed.

He was signed by the Cubs as an amateur free agent in 1949.

References

External links

1930 births
2014 deaths
Major League Baseball outfielders
Chicago Cubs players
Baseball players from Illinois
Nashville Vols players